Pete Kaligis (born January 6, 1971) is an American college football coach, currently the assistant head coach and defensive tackles coach at Washington State University. A two-sport athlete at the University of Washington in football and track and field, he was a starting guard for the 1991 national champions, a three-time Rose Bowl participant, and an All-American shot putter. Kaligis has been an assistant coach for various college football programs since 1994.

High school
Born and raised in Bellingham, Washington, Kaligis graduated from Bellingham High School.

College
Kaligis played college football at the University of Washington from 1990 to 1993, where he was an offensive lineman and an All-American in the shot put.

Coaching
Following his playing career at Washington, Kaligis began a college football coaching career with stints at Western Washington, Washington, Montana, and Wyoming.

In 2012, Kaligis acted as interim head coach for Wyoming against Boise State while head coach Dave Christensen served a one-game suspension following a profanity-laced tirade after a one-point loss to Air Force two weeks earlier.  However, Wyoming credits the entire season to Christensen.

On December 2, 2021, Washington State University announced the hiring of Kaligis as both assistant head coach and defensive tackles coach.

Head coaching record

Notes

References

External links
Washington State profile
Wyoming profile

1971 births
Living people
American football offensive linemen
American male shot putters
Washington Huskies football players
Western Washington Vikings football coaches
Washington Huskies football coaches
Montana Grizzlies football coaches
Wyoming Cowboys football coaches
College men's track and field athletes in the United States
Sportspeople from Bellingham, Washington
Players of American football from Washington (state)